Whitehall is a historic home located at Greenville, South Carolina. It was built in 1813 as a summer residence by Charlestonian Henry Middleton on land purchased from Elias Earle. Whitehall served as Middleton's summer home until 1820. It is a simple white frame structure with shuttered windows and wide first and second story galleries, or piazzas, in the Barbadian style.

It was added to the National Register of Historic Places in 1969.

References

Houses on the National Register of Historic Places in South Carolina
Houses completed in 1813
Houses in Greenville, South Carolina
National Register of Historic Places in Greenville, South Carolina